St James' Chapel is in the village of Lindsey, Suffolk, England.  It was built in about 1250 and is a scheduled ancient monument.  The chapel is recorded in the National Heritage List for England as a designated Grade I listed building.

The chapel is a substantial building constructed of flint, brick and stone. It has a tie beam roof covered with thatch.

History

The chapel originated as a chantry chapel for the nearby Lindsay Castle, all remains of which have now vanished apart from some low earthworks.

References

External links

Grade I listed churches in Suffolk
Scheduled monuments in Suffolk
English Heritage sites in Suffolk
Chapels in England
Babergh District